The Jiangya Dam is a concrete gravity dam on the Loushui River, located  northeast of Zhangjiajie in Hunan Province, China. The primary purpose of the multi-purpose dam is flood control but it also generates hydroelectricty, supplies water for irrigation and municipal use and improves navigation.

Background
The dam's power plant has a 300 MW capacity and generates on average 756 GWh annually. The dam also reserves  for flood storage and supports a 20-ton ship lift. Construction on the dam began in 1995, the first generator was operational in 1998 and the project complete in 1999. The dam was constructed with roller-compacted concrete (RCC) and is noteworthy because it was the first dam to use the slope/inclined laying process as opposed to horizontal. This technique was used from the dam's midsection upward and reduced both the cost and time of construction. The dam was constructed at a cost of about US$400 million, of which $97 million was provided by the World Bank.

Design
The dam's spillway is controlled by four gates and at the base of the chutes, flip buckets dissipate the water's energy. Within the three center spillway piers are three intermediate outlets. The dam's power house is located underground on the dam's right bank and contains three 100 MW Francis turbine-generators. The irrigation intake is located on the left bank of the reservoir.

See also

List of dams and reservoirs in China
List of major power stations in Hunan

References

Dams in China
Hydroelectric power stations in Hunan
Gravity dams
Dams completed in 1999
Roller-compacted concrete dams
Underground power stations
1999 establishments in China